Myriam Ghassan Neaimeh (born 28 December 1983) is a Lebanese former footballer who played as a central midfielder or centre-back.

Club career 
Neaimeh began her career in Lebanon, captaining Ansar, before moving to Europe in 2009 at Hungarian side 1. FC Femina in the Női NB I. The following year, she moved to England, studying at the University of Manchester while playing for their football team.

On 27 February 2012, Neaimeh joined Newcastle United, before moving to Rutherford in summer 2015. She helped them win the 2015–16 North East Regional Women's Football League Northern Division, and reached the Durham County FA Women’s Cup final.

International career 
Neaimeh represented the Lebanon national team, playing in the 2006 Arab Championship and the 2007 WAFF Championship as the team's captain.

Personal life 
In 2009, Neaimeh moved to Budapest, Hungary to do a two-year master's in environmental science. She moved to Manchester, England in 2010 to study at the University of Manchester. In November 2011, Neaimeh started working as a researcher on electric vehicles at Newcastle University. In 2015 she worked in partnership with Japanese car manufacturer Nissan.

Honours 
Ansar
 Lebanese Women's FA Cup: 2008, 2009

Rutherford
 North East Regional Women's Football League Northern Division: 2015–16

Lebanon
 WAFF Women's Championship third place: 2007

See also
 List of Lebanon women's international footballers

References

1983 births
Living people
Lebanese women's footballers
Women's association football midfielders
Women's association football defenders
Al Ansar FC (women) players
1. FC Femina players
Newcastle United W.F.C. players
Lebanese Women's Football League players
FA Women's National League players
Lebanon women's international footballers
Lebanese expatriate women's footballers
Lebanese expatriate sportspeople in Hungary
Lebanese expatriate sportspeople in England
Expatriate women's footballers in Hungary
Expatriate women's footballers in England